Terrence Harrell Whitehead (born May 31, 1983) is a former American football running back. He was signed by the Cincinnati Bengals as an undrafted free agent in 2006. He played college football at Oregon.

Whitehead has also been a member of the BC Lions and Las Vegas Locomotives.

External links
Oregon Ducks bio

1983 births
Living people
Players of American football from California
American football running backs
American players of Canadian football
Canadian football running backs
Oregon Ducks football players
Cincinnati Bengals players
BC Lions players
Las Vegas Locomotives players
Sportspeople from Los Angeles County, California
People from Gardena, California